This is the discography page of the Bosnian rapper Edo Maajka.

Music videos

Edo Maajka albums
Slušaj Mater
Znaš me
Jesmo'l sami
Prikaze
No Sikiriki
No Sikiriki
Pržiiiii
Obećana rijeć
Ne-mo-žes
Mater vam jebem
Stig'o Ćumur
To mora da je ljubav
Bomba
To što se traži
Rek'o sam joj
Balkansko a naše
Gansi
Sve prolazi
Spomen ploča 2002-2009
Ove godine
Fotelja
Štrajk mozga
Panika
Facebook

Production discography

Hip hop discographies
Discographies of Bosnia and Herzegovina artists